Lavelle R Felton (October 5, 1979 – August 13, 2009) was an American professional basketball player playing in the European professional basketball leagues.

Amateur career
Nicknamed "Velle" or "Romie", he had played in Madison High School in Milwaukee and then played college basketball with the Louisiana Tech University's Bulldogs where he averaged 13.7 points and 5.1 rebounds a game in 2002–03.

Professional career
He started his professional basketball career in the Turkish Basketball League's Büyük Kolej for two years, before moving on to Greece and France and finally landing in Germany playing for Paderborn Baskets club in the German Basketball Bundesliga. Averaging 10.5 points and 3.1 rebounds per game in the 2008-09 season, Felton helped the club successfully reach the playoffs.

Death and involvement
Felton was out with friends at a nightclub on the morning of August 12, 2009. They were celebrating his recent success, as he was about to sign a new contract with Germany. Lavelle was fatally shot and seriously wounded by an unknown gunman while in his driver's seat, about to depart from a Milwaukee gas station around 2am local time, dying of his wounds just one day later. He left a five-year-old stepson, a four-year-old son, and a two-year-old daughter with his girlfriend.

See also
List of basketball players who died during their careers
List of unsolved murders

References

1979 births
2009 deaths
AEK B.C. players
African-American basketball players
American expatriate basketball people in France
American expatriate basketball people in Germany
American expatriate basketball people in Greece
American expatriate basketball people in Turkey
American men's basketball players
ASVEL Basket players
Basketball players from Milwaukee
Chipola Indians men's basketball players
Deaths by firearm in Wisconsin
Guards (basketball)
Iraklis Thessaloniki B.C. players
Louisiana Tech Bulldogs basketball players
Male murder victims
Murdered African-American people
Paderborn Baskets players
People murdered in Wisconsin
Science City Jena players
Unsolved murders in the United States
20th-century African-American sportspeople
21st-century African-American sportspeople